Fireflies in the Sun is a 2021 Chinese crime thriller film produced by Chen Sicheng, directed by Dai Mo, and starring Xiao Yang, Janice Man, and Simon Yam. It is a remake of the 2002 American thriller drama film John Q., which was directed by Nick Cassavetes and starring Denzel Washington. It is not a sequel to Sheep Without a Shepherd. It follows the story of Lin Rilang, a father and husband whose son is diagnosed with an enlarged heart and gives all his efforts to collect money for his son's operation. The film premiered in China on 17 December 2021.

Cast
 Xiao Yang as Lin Rilang, a screenwriter 
 Janice Man as Ah Ling, Lin Rilang's wife
 Simon Yam as Zhang Zhengyi, police
 Wang Haoze as Xiaochong, son
 Chen Yusi as Li Anqi, journalist
 Song Yang as Dama, Xiaochong's attending doctor
 Aarif Rahman sa Sading, mayor's secretary
 Tan Zhuo

Production
The producers originally decided to go to Thailand again for the view. However, due to the impact of the COVID-19 pandemic, they built a street view of Thailand in Jiangmen, Guangdong, and the indoor play was completed in the studio of Xiangshan Global Studios.

Release
Fireflies in the Sun was released in China on 17 December 2021.

Box office
Fireflies in the Sun earned a total of 300 million yuan in its first three days of release.

References

External links
 
 
 

2021 films
2020s Mandarin-language films
Chinese crime thriller films
Films set in Thailand
Films shot in Guangdong
Films shot in Zhejiang
2021 crime thriller films